John Beckett may refer to:

Politicians
 Sir John Beckett, 2nd Baronet (1775–1847), British lawyer and Tory politician
 John Beckett (politician) (1894–1964), British Labour Party then far right politician

Others
 John Beckett (American football) (1892–1981), American college football player
 John Beckett (GC) (1906–1947), Royal Air Force airman
 John Beckett, Lord Beckett, Scottish judge of the Supreme Courts
 John S. Beckett (1927–2007), Irish musician, composer, and conductor
 John R. Beckett (1918–2010), American businessman
 John Beckett (historian) (born 1950), professor of English regional history
 John Beckett (born 1958), guitarist with Adam and the Ants, stage name Johnny Bivouac.